Emilio Floris (born September 15, 1944) is an Italian politician. A trained physician, he started his political career in the mid-1990s as a member of Forza Italia. In 2001, he was elected mayor of the Sardinian capital Cagliari.

Medical career
Emilio Floris specialized in radiology, cardiology and occupational medicine. After graduating, he worked temporarily for public hospitals in Cagliari and Guspini. Later he became administrative leader of two privately owned hospitals in Cagliari and Oristano, in which he also performed medical work.

During this time he was also engaged in public functions, becoming leader of the Italian Association of Private Hospitals 'AIOP' as well as president of the cultural society "La Radice" and of a local soccer club.

Political career
In 1994, Emilio Floris was among the founding members of Forza Italia in Sardinia. He became chairman of the party's group in the regional council after receiving one of the best results of all candidates. Later during his term he was also elected as provincial coordinator of his party. After confirming his electoral success in the 1999 elections, Floris retained his position as group leader in the council.

Two years later, he was elected mayor of his home town Cagliari with the respectable result of 56.9% of all votes, giving him a simple majority already in the first round. He was reelected as mayor in the 2006 elections, with 53.6% in the balloting vote.

External links
Homepage of Emilio Floris 
Mayor of Cagliari 

1944 births
Living people
People from Cagliari
Forza Italia politicians
Mayors of Cagliari
20th-century Italian people
21st-century Italian people